Attempted assassination of Gerald Ford may refer to:

Attempted assassination of Gerald Ford in Sacramento by Lynette "Squeaky" Fromme
Attempted assassination of Gerald Ford in San Francisco by Sara Jane Moore